Myrmecia is a genus of green algae that is associated with lichens.

References

Trebouxiophyceae genera
Trebouxiophyceae
Trebouxiales